Hyperaspis dissoluta, the dissolute lady beetle, is a species of lady beetles in the family Coccinellidae. It is found in North America.

Subspecies
 Hyperaspis dissoluta dissoluta Crotch, 1873
 Hyperaspis dissoluta nevadica Casey, 1899

References

Further reading

 
 
 
 

Coccinellidae
Beetles described in 1873